K. J. Hippensteel (born May 8, 1980) is a retired American tennis player.

Career
Hippensteel attended Stanford University, where he was a four-time All-American. He was the #1 ranked player in NCAA tennis his sophomore and senior year. Before attending Stanford, Hippensteel was a US Open Boys' Doubles champion with eventual Stanford teammate David Martin in 1998. He also has ITF junior wins over Guillermo Coria and Andy Roddick. He reached a career-high ATP singles ranking of World No. 150 in November 2004, before being slowed by elbow and back injuries.

Junior Grand Slam finals

Doubles: 1 (1 title)

ATP Challenger and ITF Futures finals

Singles: 9 (5–4)

Doubles: 9 (7–2)

External links

K. J. Hippensteel's Australian Open profile
K. J. Hippensteel's Circuit Player Of The Week article

1980 births
Living people
American male tennis players
Sportspeople from Roanoke, Virginia
Stanford Cardinal men's tennis players
Tennis people from Virginia
US Open (tennis) junior champions
Grand Slam (tennis) champions in boys' doubles